= Boukolion =

Ancient town of Lydia

Coordinates: 38°08′10″N 27°42′53″E

Boukolion was a town of ancient Lydia, inhabited during Roman times.

Its site is located south of Çatal, Asiatic Turkey.
